Anthem is a master-planned community partially located within Phoenix and partially located within a census-designated place (CDP), New River. The community is entirely located in Maricopa County, Arizona, United States, within the Phoenix Metropolitan Area. As of the 2020 census, the population of the Anthem CDP was 23,190.

History
Anthem has been described as one of the best places to raise a family by Parenting magazine and one of the best family friendly neighborhoods in the Phoenix area by Phoenix Magazine.

Anthem is well known for its year-round activities, primarily geared towards families. The community center offers youth soccer, baseball, basketball, tennis, various forms of martial arts, and swimming amongst other activities for ages as early as toddler years. Homeowner's association dues cover a pool larger than Olympic size, a community water park with slides and various depths for all swimming levels, paths that crisscross the town, bike paths that circle all major streets, and pocket parks scattered throughout the town. In addition, there is a 63-acre community park complete with an amphitheater, many grassy areas, volleyball, soccer, football, baseball and little league fields along with a train, pavilion, lakes and pagodas.

On July 31, 2012, a storm dropped  of rain on Anthem in the span of 90 minutes, causing widespread flooding that damaged homes and required the rescue of nine people. A subsequent investigation into the flood concluded that the storm was a "one-in-1,000 year rain catastrophe".

Geography
Approximately 36 percent of the community is preserved as open space, including  of open hillside.

The community is bordered on the north, east and south by the New River CDP, while the western portion of the community is located within Phoenix city limits.

Climate
Due to its higher elevation in the upper Sonoran Desert, Anthem is slightly cooler and receives a higher level of rainfall than areas of Phoenix to the south.

Demographics 

Anthem first appeared on the 2010 U.S. Census as a census-designated place (CDP).

As of the 2010 Census, there were 21,700 people, 7,451 households, and 6,037 families residing in the community. In 2014, there were 10,107 households and over 30,000 people. The racial makeup of the city was 89.7% White, 2.9% African American, 0.6% Native American, 2.6% Asian, 2.1% from other races, and 3.0% from two or more races. Hispanic or Latino of any race were 9.2% of the population. There were 7,451 households, out of which 46.2% had children under the age of 18 living with them, 67.4% were married couples living together, 9.2% had a female householder with no husband present, 4.4% had a male householder with no wife present, and 19.0% were non-families. 14.7% of all households were made up of individuals living alone, and 4.4% had someone living alone who was 65 years of age or older. The average household size was 2.91 and the average family size was 3.24. The median age in the community was 36.8 years.

According to the American Community Survey, 11.8% of residents had attained a graduate or professional degree as their highest degree, 27.7% had a bachelor's degree, 7.8% had an associate degree, 26.9% had some college but no degree, 20.4% had only a high school diploma, and 5.5% had less than a high school diploma.

Economy

The community is served by several large chain retailers, including Fry's Marketplace and Walmart. The local outlet mall, Outlets at Anthem, includes over 60 stores. In 2015, a Safeway location was sold to Haggen, but that Haggen shut down shortly thereafter. As of January 2017, Safeway has reopened in the space that was previously occupied by Haggen.

The Anthem Community council has a committee on the treasury which deals with financial issues and elects a chairman to be in charge of this committee. Also, each of the three homeowner associations has a treasurer who deals with the monetary issues of their subdivision of Anthem

The Anthem Christmas tree, installed every year at Outlets at Anthem, is the tallest in the state, and is often listed as the tallest Christmas tree in the United States.

Government
Anthem is split into three main subdivisions. Parkside, Country Club and the Village. Each subdivision has its own homeowner's association and each of these elects a Board of Directors consisting of five members. From the five directors on each board, a president, vice-president, secretary and treasurer is elected.

Both Parkside and Country Club homeowners' associations elect three representatives, while the village homeowner's association elects one representative, to the seven member Anthem Community Council Board of Directors. Those seven Anthem Community Council Directors elect one of those representatives who serves as president of that board and is considered the highest authority in Anthem. Other positions within the council's board consist of vice-president, secretary and treasurer.

Parkside, one of the subdivisions of Anthem has homes west and east of Interstate 17. The east is served by Maricopa County, and the west is served by the City of Phoenix. The Anthem Community Council, a nonprofit community association, establishes plans and policies for the community and manages community assets. It also serves as the community's legislative body, but is mainly restricted to making laws that only apply to the three homeowner Associations of Anthem.

There are more than 20 neighborhoods in Anthem including Jubilation, Inspiration and Arroyo Grande.

The portions of Anthem that lie east of Interstate 17 receive police service from the Maricopa County Sheriff's Office and fire service from the Daisy Mountain Fire Department. Portions of Anthem west of Interstate 17 receive both police and fire service from the City of Phoenix  Water and sewer utilities are provided by a private utility, EPCOR Water on the east side and City of Phoenix services on the west side of I-17.

Education
Anthem is served by the Deer Valley Unified School District (DVUSD) as well as several private and charter schools. The nearest colleges and universities are Glendale Community College, Paradise Valley Community College, and Arizona State University at the West campus.

DVUSD schools
 Anthem School (K–8)
 Canyon Springs STEM Academy (K–8)
 Diamond Canyon School (K–8)
 Gavilan Peak School (K–8)
 New River Elementary School (K–8)
 Boulder Creek High School (9–12)

Charter schools
 Anthem Preparatory Academy (6–12)
 Archway Academy (K–5)
 Caurus Academy (K–12)
 Ridgeline Academy (K–12)

Private schools 
 Creative Castle Preschool and Kindergarten
 North Valley Christian Academy (Preschool, K–12)

Transportation
Interstate 17 is the primary connection between Anthem and Downtown Phoenix. A frontage road running along the east side of Interstate 17 and connecting Carefree Highway in North Gateway to Gavilan Peak Parkway in Anthem opened in October 2009. This frontage road connects to North Valley Parkway and Norterra Parkway in North Gateway, providing Anthem with surface street access to the rest of the Phoenix metropolitan area. Valley Metro does not provide bus service to Anthem; however, the agency can provide a vehicle for vanpooling service.

Memorial
The Anthem Veterans Memorial is a monument dedicated to honoring the sacrifice and service made by members of the United States Armed Forces. The memorial's five white pillars represent the nation's military branches and are arranged in the Department of Defense order of precedence. Each pillar has an elliptical opening that slants downward toward The Great Seal of the United States. On Veterans Day (November 11), the design allows the sun's rays to spotlight the Great Seal at precisely 11:11 AM.

Notable people
 Erik Affholter (born 1966), NFL wide receiver
 David Spindel (born 1941), photographer

References

External links

 Anthem Community Council
 Anthem Area Chamber of Commerce
 Images of the Anthem Veterans Memorial

Census-designated places in Maricopa County, Arizona
Populated places established in 1998
Planned cities in the United States
Phoenix metropolitan area
1998 establishments in Arizona